The electoral division of Prosser is one of the fifteen electorates in the Tasmanian Legislative Council, it includes the south-east coast of Tasmania, the Sorell township and the Tasman Peninsula. Prosser is named after the Prosser River, which flows through the centre of the division.

Their current MLC is Jane Howlett, a member of the Liberal Party, who was first elected in 2018.

History and electoral profile
The division was created following the 2016–17 Legislative Council redistribution process. The new name of Prosser was adopted to avoid confusion because of the significant changes made to the electoral boundaries in the region.

Prosser includes all of the Glamorgan Spring Bay and Tasman municipal areas and parts of the municipal areas of the Northern Midlands, Southern Midlands, Brighton and Sorell. The electorate covers most of the rural south eastern corner of Tasmania.

Members

As a result of the changes made following the 2016–17 Legislative Council redistribution process, the single-seat electorate of McIntyre was temporarily assigned two MLCs, Greg Hall and Tania Rattray, until the expiration of Hall's term in 2018. The expiration of Hall's term coincided with the 2018 periodic elections where a member for new division of Prosser was elected.  On 15 May 2018, the Tasmanian Electoral Commission declared Jane Howlett to be elected as the member for Prosser until 2024.

See also

 Tasmanian House of Assembly
 Electoral division of Apsley (former electorate)
 Electoral division of Western Tiers (former electorate)

References

External links
Parliament of Tasmania
Tasmanian Electoral Commission – Legislative Council

Prosser